The 2022 North Dakota State Bison women's soccer team represented North Dakota State University during the 2022 NCAA Division I women's soccer season. The Bison play in the Summit League.
NDSU made the Summit League tournament as the fifth seed. They lost to Oral Roberts in the quarterfinals to be eliminated from contention. The Bison finished the season with an 8-9-3 record and a 4-5-0 Summit League record, good for fifth in the conference.

Previous season
The Bison finished the 2021 season with a 3-6 record in Summit League play, and a 3-12-1 record overall. NDSU finished the season 8th in the conference and did not make the Summit League tournament.

Team Personnel

Roster

Reference:

Coaching Staff

Reference:

Schedule

|-
!colspan=6 style=""| Exhibition

|-
!colspan=6 style=""| Non-conference Regular Season

|-
!colspan=6 style=""| Summit League Regular Season

|-
!colspan=6 style=|Summit League tournament

^ - Utah Tech was known as Dixie State before 2022
Reference:

Season Honors

All-Summit League

Second Team
 Paige Goaley

Honorable Mention
 Abby Wilkinson

All-Newcomer Team
 Elana Webber

Source:

Summit League All-Tournament Team
 Katilyn Hanson

Source:

Reference

North Dakota State Bison